C/2020 F5 (MASTER) is a long period comet discovered on 28 March 2020, by the MASTER auto-detection system near San Juan, Argentina. When first discovered there were dubious claims that it might be an interstellar object, but now it is known to have a common weakly hyperbolic eccentricity of just 1.0007. Before planetary perturbations the comet had an orbital period of about 36000 years.

Notes

External links
 C/2020 F5 ( MASTER )
JPL Small-Body Database Browser

Astronomical objects discovered in 2020
Comets in 2020